Senior Hall may refer to:

Senior Hall (Berkeley, California), listed on the NRHP in California
Senior Hall (Columbia, Missouri), listed on the NRHP in Missouri

Architectural disambiguation pages